The Sengkang Group Representation Constituency is a four-member Group Representation Constituency (GRC) in the north-eastern region of Singapore. The GRC consists of four divisions: Anchorvale, Rivervale, Buangkok, and Compassvale; Compassvale was subsumed into the other three following the resignation of its MP, Raeesah Khan. The current Members of Parliament are He Ting Ru, Jamus Lim and Louis Chua from the Workers' Party (WP).

History
Before the 2020 general election, Sengkang GRC was formed by merging the bulk of Sengkang West SMC with Punggol East SMC and the Sengkang Central ward.  Punggol East SMC would become the Sengkang East ward while Sengkang Central was to be split into Sengkang Central ward and Sengkang North ward.

The Worker's Party which was led by He Ting Ru won the GRC in the 2020 general election, marking the second time the opposition won another GRC since the introduction of the GRC scheme in 1988 and on its first attempt with 52.12% 	against People's Action Party (PAP) led by Ng Chee Meng with 47.88%. 

WP adjusted the wards, splitting Sengkang Central into two wards, Buangkok (south) and Compassvale (north), renaming Sengkang East as Rivervale and Sengkang West as Anchorvale. The PAP branches retained the old names, making this the only GRC in which the WP and the PAP named the wards differently.

On 30 November 2021, Raeesah Khan resigned from Parliament after making unsubstantiated allegations in Parliament on three occasions. No by-election will be called although the GRC has lost its minority representative. As a result of Khan's resignation, minority and female representation in Parliament have both slipped to 26 elected MPs.

Members of Parliament

Raeesah Begum Bte Farid Khan resigned from the Workers' Party on 30 November 2021, effectively ending her tenure as MP. However, no by-election was called on the ground since it was a Group Representation Constituency and Compassvale ward was carved up and subsumed into the other three existing wards following Raeesah Khan's resignation and Aljunied GRC MP, Muhamad Faisal bin Abdul Manap will be the advisory capacity not MP for Sengkang.

Electoral results

Elections in 2020s

See also
 Punggol West Single Member Constituency

References

External links
2020 General Election's result

Singaporean electoral divisions
Ang Mo Kio
Punggol
Seletar
Sengkang
Constituencies established in 2020
2020 establishments in Singapore